Málek (feminine Málková) is a Czech surname, derived from the word malý (small). Notable people include:

 Andrej Málek (born 1995), Slovak canoeist
 Daniel Málek (born 1973), Czech swimmer
 Marie Málková (born 1941), Czech actress
 Petr Málek (1961–2019), Czech sport shooter
 Roman Málek (born 1977), Czech ice hockey player
 Zdeňka Málková (born 1975), Czech tennis player

See also 
 Malek, Arabic given name

Czech-language surnames